Al-Hasakah District is a district of al-Hasakah Governorate in northeastern Syria. The administrative centre for the district is the city of al-Hasakah. At the 2004 census, the district had a population of 480,394.

Demographics 
In 1939, French mandate authorities reported the following population numbers for the different ethnic and religious groups in al-Hasakah area.

Subdistricts
The district of al-Hasakah is divided into seven subdistricts or nawāḥī (population as of 2004):

References

 
Districts of Al-Hasakah Governorate
Assyrian communities in Syria